Apac is a town in Apac District in the Northern Region of Uganda. It is the 'chief town' of the district and the district headquarters are located there. The district is named after the town.

Location
The coordinates of the town are:1°59'06.0"N, 32°32'06.0"E (Latitude:1.9850; Longitude:32.5350).

Population
The 2002 national census estimated the population of the town at about 10,140. In 2010, the population of Apac was estimated at about 13,300, by the Uganda Bureau of Statistics (UBOS). In 2011, UBOS estimated the mid-year population of Apac at approximately 13,700.

In August 2014, the national population census put the population of Apac at 14,972. In 2020, the population agency estimated the mid-year population of Apac Municipality at 66,700.

Localities 

 Putanga

Points of interest
The following points of interest lie in the town or near the town limits: (a) the headquarters of Apac District Administration (b) the offices of Apac Municipal Council (c) Apac General Hospital, a 120-bed public hospital, administered by the Uganda Ministry of Health (d) Alenga Primary School, a public elementary school on the outskirts of town (e) Apac Central Market, the source of daily fresh produce and (f) Rwekunye–Apac–Aduku–Lira–Kitgum–Musingo Road passes through town in a general west to east direction.

Notable people
Milton Obote, former President and Prime Minister

See also
 Lango sub-region
 Lango people
 Apac District
 Northern Region, Uganda
 List of cities and towns in Uganda

References

External links
 Official Website
 Visiting Apac Town

Populated places in Northern Region, Uganda
Apac District
Lango sub-region